Luis Alfonso Henríquez Ledezma (born 23 November 1981 in Panama City) is a Panamanian professional footballer who plays as a left-back for Szturm Junikowo Poznań.

Club career
Nicknamed Coco, Henríquez played for Sporting '89 and Árabe Unido in Panama before moving abroad to play for Colombian side Envigado. After 2 seasons back in Panama with Tauro he joined Polish giants Lech Poznań in 2007 for a lengthy spell. He was released by Lech in summer 2015 after 8 years with the club.

Henríquez returned to Tauro in September 2015.

International career
Henríquez made his debut for Panama in an August 2003 friendly match against Paraguay and has, as of 10 June 2015, earned a total of 75 caps, scoring 2 goals. He represented his country in 26 FIFA World Cup qualification matches and was a member of the 2005 CONCACAF Gold Cup team, who finished second in the tournament. He also played at the 2007 and 2011 CONCACAF Gold Cups.

International goals
Scores and results list Panama's goal tally first.

Honors
Árabe Unido
Liga Panameña de Fútbol: 2004

Tauro
Liga Panameña de Fútbol: 2007 (A)

Lech Poznań
Ekstraklasa: 2009–10, 2014–15
Polish Cup: 2008–09

References

External links

1981 births
Living people
Sportspeople from Panama City
Association football defenders
Panamanian footballers
Panama international footballers
2005 UNCAF Nations Cup players
2005 CONCACAF Gold Cup players
2007 UNCAF Nations Cup players
2007 CONCACAF Gold Cup players
2011 CONCACAF Gold Cup players
2015 CONCACAF Gold Cup players
Copa América Centenario players
Sporting San Miguelito players
C.D. Árabe Unido players
Envigado F.C. players
Tauro F.C. players
Lech Poznań players
Polonia Środa Wielkopolska players
Panamanian expatriate footballers
Expatriate footballers in Colombia
Expatriate footballers in Poland
Panamanian expatriate sportspeople in Colombia
Panamanian expatriate sportspeople in Poland
Categoría Primera A players
Ekstraklasa players
III liga players